is a railway station on the Saikyō Line in Kita, Tokyo, Japan, operated by the East Japan Railway Company (JR East).

Lines
Some trains continue northward to  via the Kawagoe Line and southward to  via the TWR Rinkai Line. The station is located 8.6 km north of Ikebukuro Station. The station identification colour is "tokiwa green".

The station name is taken from the Ukima and Funado districts in which the station lies.

Under the JR fare calculation system, this station is the northern boundary station of the "Tokyo 23 Districts" area.

Station layout

The station consists of one elevated island platform serving two tracks. The tracks of the Tōhoku Shinkansen also run adjacent to this station, on the west side.

Platforms

History
Ukimafunado Station opened on 30 September 1985.

Passenger statistics
In fiscal 2011, the station was used by an average of 19,463 passengers daily (boarding passengers only).

The passenger figures for previous years are as shown below.

Surrounding area
 Arakawa River
 Ukima Park
 National Route 17

Schools
 Shibaura Institute of Technology Junior and Senior High School
 Kita Ward Ukima Junior High School
 Kita Ward Ukima Elementary School
 Itabashi Ward Shimura No. 5 Junior High School
 Itabashi Ward Funado Elementary School

See also
 List of railway stations in Japan

References

External links

 Ukima-Funado Station information (JR East) 

Railway stations in Japan opened in 1985
Railway stations in Tokyo